is a Japanese politician of the Liberal Democratic Party (LDP), a member of the House of Representatives in the Diet (national legislature). A native of Yokkaichi, Mie and graduate of Keio University, he was elected to the House of Representatives for the first time in 1995 as an independent. After losing his seat in 2000, he was re-elected in 2003 and represented the 3rd District of Mie prefecture until 2009.

References

External links 
  in Japanese.

1948 births
Living people
People from Yokkaichi
Keio University alumni
Members of the House of Councillors (Japan)
Members of the House of Representatives (Japan)
Liberal Democratic Party (Japan) politicians
21st-century Japanese politicians